Stade de la Libération is a multi-use stadium in Boulogne-sur-Mer, France.  It is currently used mostly for football matches and is the home stadium of US Boulogne. The stadium is able to hold 9534 people.

US Boulogne
Liberation
Sports venues in Pas-de-Calais
Sports venues completed in 1956